Peter Kolény is a Slovak astronomer. He is a prolific discoverer of asteroids. As of January 2010, the IAU Minor Planet Center credits him with the discovery or codiscovery of 35 asteroids.

List of discovered minor planets

References 
 

Discoverers of asteroids

Slovak astronomers
Living people
Year of birth missing (living people)